Dezső Csépai (1953-2007) is a Hungarian sprint canoer who competed in the early 1980s. He won a silver medal in the C-1 1000 m event at the 1982 ICF Canoe Sprint World Championships in Belgrade.

References 
 
 

Hungarian male canoeists
1953 births
ICF Canoe Sprint World Championships medalists in Canadian
2007 deaths